Methanothrix soehngenii is a species of methanogenic archaea. Its cells are non-motile, non-spore-forming, rod-shaped (0.8×2 μm) and are normally combined end to end in long filaments, surrounded by a sheath-like structure. It is named in honour of N. L. Söhngen.

Metabolism

Unlike other methanogenic archaea, Methanothrix soehngenii cannot reduce carbon dioxide with hydrogen to produce methane.  Its sole source of energy is acetate.

Genome

The tRNAala gene of Methanothrix soehngenii differs from those of other archaea in that it encodes a terminal CCA 3′.

References

Further reading

External links

LSPN
Type strain of Methanothrix soehngenii at BacDive -  the Bacterial Diversity Metadatabase

Euryarchaeota
Archaea described in 1982